Jackson Township is a township in Union County, Arkansas, United States. Its total population was 758 as of the 2010 United States Census, a decrease of 1.56 percent from 770 at the 2000 census.

According to the 2010 Census, Jackson Township is located at  (33.051999, -92.625904).

References

External links 

Townships in Arkansas
Union County, Arkansas